Ian Geoffrey Neale (born 11 August 1954) is a British gymnast. He competed in seven events at the 1976 Summer Olympics.

References

External links
 
British Men's Artistic Gymnastics Champions - Gymnastics History

1954 births
Living people
British male artistic gymnasts
Olympic gymnasts of Great Britain
Gymnasts at the 1976 Summer Olympics
Place of birth missing (living people)
Commonwealth Games medallists in gymnastics
Commonwealth Games silver medallists for England
Gymnasts at the 1978 Commonwealth Games
Sportspeople from Coventry
Medallists at the 1978 Commonwealth Games